A traffic paddle is a hand-held paddle-shaped signal used by police, traffic wardens, fire brigade, airport ground staff and others to direct traffic.

See also
 Road Traffic Control

Traffic signs